The Atlantica Party is a political party in the province of Nova Scotia, Canada. The party supports policies that are based on classical liberal principles such as laissez-faire "free market" economics, freedom of business, and freedom of the individual. The party also seeks to increase citizen participation in all levels of government with additional oversight of current government structure.

History
The Atlantica Party was registered as a political party by Elections Nova Scotia on June 28, 2016.

Its first contested election was the 2017 provincial election. The party ran 15 candidates then and received a total of 1,632 votes, 0.4% of the provincial total.

On January 8, 2018, inaugural party leader Jonathan Dean announced his resignation from the party. Ryan Smyth was named as interim leader of the party on January 16, 2018; however, he took over as interim leader on January 7, 2018, the effective date of Dean's resignation.

On June 20, 2018, Chief Electoral Officer of Elections Nova Scotia, Richard Temporale, suspended the party for breaches of sections 216(3)(a) and 216(3)(b) respectively due to an illegal loan made by former leader, Jonathan Dean. On July 31, Mr. Dean entered into a compliance agreement with Elections Nova Scotia. The party entered into its own compliance agreement with Elections Nova Scotia on August 7, 2018. The party was reinstated by Elections Nova Scotia on August 16, 2018.

Ryan Smyth resigned as interim leader on April 18, 2019; subsequently, Thomas Bethell was elected as the new interim leader by the party on April 23, 2019.

Under Bethell, the Atlantica Party contested three by-elections to the 63rd General Assembly of Nova Scotia. On June 18, 2019, David Boyd received 43 votes, 0.7% of the total vote in the riding of Sackville-Cobequid. On September 3, 2019, interim leader, Thomas Bethell received 28 votes, 0.4% of the total vote in the riding of Northside-Westmount. On March 10, 2020, Matthew Rushton received 55 votes, 1.0% of the total in the electoral district of Truro-Bible Hill-Millbrook-Salmon River.

Bethell resigned as leader March 26, 2020, and Smyth returned as interim leader on March 29, 2020.

On August 31, 2020, the Halifax Examiner reported that Jonathan Dean was once again leader. Bousquet noted that he believed Dean leaked the announcement of his own return.

On November 20, 2020, the party finally issued an announcement that Mr. Dean had returned as leader, nearly three months after he was appointed by the executive without any consultation with the party's membership.

On November 26, 2020, Mr. Dean gave his first interview in nearly three years on The Rick Howe Show. Dean blamed his dismissal from the party on a former executive that had deviated, in Dean's words, from the party's original "big ideas". He also touted the party's "highest polling numbers ever" in the 2017 election; the only general election that the party has ever run in. Mr. Howe correctly noted that the party finished in last place in all fifteen electoral districts in which it ran in that election. When questioned about his appointment as leader, Dean falsely affirmed that he was "elected" by a "unanimous party vote", offering no evidence to substantiate this unfounded claim.

The party did not win any seats in the 2021 provincial election.

Party leaders 
 Jonathan Geoffrey Dean (June 26, 2016 – January 7, 2018)
 Jeffrey Ryan Smyth (interim) (January 7, 2018 – April 18, 2019)
 Thomas James Bethell (interim) (April 23, 2019 – March 26, 2020)
 Jeffrey Ryan Smyth (interim) (March 29, 2020 –  August 31, 2020)
 Jonathan Geoffrey Dean ( August 31, 2020 – present)

Election results

References

External links
 Atlantica Party official site

Political parties established in 2016
Provincial political parties in Nova Scotia